Živa Zdolšek (born October 10, 1989) is a Slovenian basketball player for KK Triglav Kranj and the Slovenian national team.

She participated at the EuroBasket Women 2017.

References

1989 births
Living people
Slovenian women's basketball players
Sportspeople from Celje
Shooting guards
European Games competitors for Slovenia
Basketball players at the 2015 European Games